The Communauté de communes Arnon Boischaut Cher is a communauté de communes, an intercommunal structure, in the Cher department, in the Centre-Val de Loire region, central France. It was created in January 2011 by the merger of the former communautés de communes Portes du Boischaut and Rives du Cher. Its area is 379.5 km2, and its population was 8,109 in 2018. Its seat is in Châteauneuf-sur-Cher.

Communes
The communauté de communes consists of the following 18 communes:

La Celle-Condé
Chambon
Châteauneuf-sur-Cher
Chavannes
Corquoy
Crézançay-sur-Cher
Lapan
Levet
Lignières
Montlouis
Saint-Baudel
Saint-Loup-des-Chaumes
Saint-Symphorien
Serruelles
Uzay-le-Venon
Vallenay
Venesmes
Villecelin

References

Arnon Boischaut Cher
Arnon Boischaut Cher